Alex Chan Hiu Fung (born 8 December 1994) is a Hong Kong professional footballer who currently plays as a midfielder for Hong Kong Premier League club Tai Po.

References

External links

Chan Hiu Fung at HKFA

Hong Kong footballers
Association football midfielders
Tai Po FC players
Yuen Long FC players
TSW Pegasus FC players
Hong Kong Premier League players
Hong Kong First Division League players
1994 births
Living people